New Marshfield is a census-designated place in central Waterloo Township, Athens County, Ohio, United States. As of the 2010 census it had a population of 326. It has a post office with the ZIP code 45766. It is located along State Route 56 west of the county seat of Athens.

The B&O Railroad formerly passed through the community, but the line was abandoned in the 1980s.

A post office called Marshfield was established in 1857, and the post office was renamed New Marshfield in 1909. By the 1880s, (New) Marshfield had a train station and several stores.

Education
Public Education in the community of New Marshfield is provided by the Alexander Local School District. Campuses serving the community include Alexander Elementary School (Grades PK-5), Alexander Middle School (Grades 6–8), and Alexander High School  (Grades 9–12).

References

Census-designated places in Ohio
Census-designated places in Athens County, Ohio
1857 establishments in Ohio
Populated places established in 1857